This is a list of domestic and international destinations of LOT Polish Airlines.

Destinations

References

No LOT service at this time to SFO or IAD

External links 
 LOT Polish Airlines

LOT Polish Airlines
Lists of airline destinations
Star Alliance destinations